Kürd (also, Kurd) is a village in the Goychay District of Azerbaijan. The village forms part of the municipality of Potu.

References 

Populated places in Goychay District